Suratgarh Air Force Station  of the Indian Air Force (IAF) is located in Suratgarh Of The Sri Ganganagar Rajasthan, India.

The air force station mainly operates the MiG 21 Bison.

Facilities
The airport is situated at an elevation of 554 feet (169 m) above mean sea level. It has four runway with concrete surfaces: 05/23 measuring 8,990 by 148 feet (2,740 x 45 m).

References

Indian Air Force bases
Airports in Rajasthan
Airports with year of establishment missing
Sri Ganganagar district